Wong Tsz Ho (born 7 March 1994 in Hong Kong) is a Hong Kong professional football player who plays as a left back for Hong Kong Premier League club Eastern.

Club career
On 12 September 2015, Wong scored the first goal in the history of the Hong Kong Premier League against Wong Tai Sin while on loan at Metro Gallery. The ended with a score of 2:0.

On 12 June 2018, Wong confirmed that he had signed a new three year contract with Eastern.

International career
On 5 June 2016, Wong made his international debut for Hong Kong in a 2016 AYA Bank Cup match against Myanmar.

Career statistics

International

Honours

Club
Eastern
 Hong Kong Senior Shield: 2019–20
 Hong Kong FA Cup: 2019–20

Individual
Best Youth Player: 2016-17

References

External links
 
 Wong Tsz Ho at HKFA
 

1994 births
Living people
Hong Kong footballers
Hong Kong Premier League players
Footballers at the 2014 Asian Games
Eastern Sports Club footballers
Metro Gallery FC players
Hong Kong Rangers FC players
Association football wingers
Association football fullbacks
Asian Games competitors for Hong Kong